Mistaken Identity is the second studio album by Australian singer Delta Goodrem, released in Australia on 8 November 2004, a day before Goodrem's twentieth birthday, by Epic and Daylight Records. Goodrem co-wrote some of the album with Guy Chambers, who also produced the album with Richard Flack and Steve Power. Mistaken Identity debuted at number-one on the Australian Albums Chart making it her second number-one album but the sales did not match up to her previous album Innocent Eyes (2003) which sold 4.5 million copies worldwide. The album produced Goodrem two more number-one singles with "Out of the Blue" and "Almost Here", and the rest of the album's singles; "Mistaken Identity" and "A Little Too Late", became top twenty hits. The album features Goodrem's first duet, "Almost Here" (with Irish singer Brian McFadden).

Content 
Music was one of the main comforts for Goodrem during the chemotherapy for her Hodgkin's lymphoma cancer diagnosis. Songs kept going around in her head: harmonies, melodies, lyrics, many deeper and darker than those that were on her debut album, Innocent Eyes. Goodrem states "It's a more grown up album", "My music changed because my life had changed; the whole world around me had changed. My music had to reflect that". "Extraordinary Day" is about the day (8 July 2003) when she was diagnosed with Hodgkin's lymphoma, "The Last Night On Earth" is a song about death and love, "The Analyst" tells the story of the hours of self-analysis she dealt with, "Be Strong" is an encouraging call for confidence and "Mistaken Identity" is Goodrem stating for the record where her head was at. She also stated "There are a lot of lyrics I wouldn't have used on the first album".

Musically the album is more classically piano driven and ventures into pop rock and pop jazz. The single "A Little Too Late" is guitar-driven pop rock song; "Mistaken Identity" is a dark, theatrical alternative pop song; while "The Last Night On Earth" is a pop rock ballad.

Goodrem states that "This time around I had time to think 'What kind of song do I want to create here?'", "I really felt the sky was the limit with this record, you could do anything in a song. I didn't feel limited at all. There were a lot more options, a lot more paths I could go down, more directions I could choose". Songwriter Guy Chambers had been keeping an eye on Goodrem's career and was impressed with her vocals and songwriting skills. The two writing together resulted in many of the album's key tracks. "'It's really unusual to work with somebody so talented, young, and brave. Who's not scared to take risks and who has the most emotional voice in pop music", You cannot help but believe every word Delta sings." Chambers states about working with Goodrem. Goodrem stated that Chambers was a classy producer and that he was an inspiration to work with. She felt they had a good connection on a musical level. "There's a definite story in the tracklisting," Goodrem says. "I felt I had to be really honest. Songs that people could still relate to but songs that also confronted issues. This past chapter of my life has been such an intense one and I wanted people to know my thoughts".

Chart performance and promotion 
"Out of the Blue" was the first song off the album to be released and was released to radio on 24 September 2004 and quickly became the most added song to radio for that week. The music video was directed by Nigel Dick and made its premier to television on 1 October, [2004, right after the Australian soap opera Neighbours. Goodrem performed the song live for the first time on 17 October 2004 at the eighteenth Annual ARIA Awards and that same night "Out of the Blue" made its debut in the charts at number-one, Goodrem's sixth consecutive number-one single in Australia. Debuting at number-one on its first week, the song also was certified platinum by ARIA and stayed at number-one for two more weeks. The song also reached the top ten in the UK and the top twenty in Greece, Ireland, and New Zealand.

Mistaken Identity debuted at number one on the ARIA Album Chart on 15 November 2004 with triple platinum sales knocking Robbie Williams album Greatest Hits off the top spot. Unlike her debut album Innocent Eyes, Mistaken Identity only spent one week at the top, being knocked off by Eminem's album Encore, and falling to number two. In its third week, it fell to number three but in its fourth week it jumped up to number two. The album spent eight weeks in the top ten. When the album was in its fourth week in the chart and its position at number two, it had gone four times platinum and by its sixth week in the chart at number five it went five times platinum. The album spent forty-six weeks in the charts, leaving at number one hundred. It was the thirteenth-highest-selling album in Australia for 2004 and the thirtieth highest selling album for 2005. In 2005 the album was nominated for one ARIA Award, "Highest Selling Album" but lost to Missy Higgins album The Sound of White (2004). The album did not perform as well in the UK, debuting and peaking at number twenty-five and then falling to forty-four in its second week. It spent a total of ten weeks in the top seventy-five and accredited gold by BPI.

The second song lifted off the album was an Australian-only release, the title track "Mistaken Identity", released to radio on 6 December 2004, and became the second-most-added song to radio for that week. The music video for the song was directed by Michael Spiccia, released on 13 December 2004 and was based on the 1984 film The NeverEnding Story. It was released as a CD single in January 2005 and debuted at number seven on the Australian Singles Chart, the fifth highest entry for that week and was certified gold by ARIA. "Almost Here" was the third song released from the album but was the second internationally, released on 31 January 2005. A song about a broken relationship, the video was filmed in a London airport between 27 and 29 October 2004. It became one of Goodrem's biggest hits, making it her seventh number-one single in Australia, her first in Ireland, and her fifth top ten hit in the UK, and was nominated for an ARIA Award in 2005 for "Highest Selling Single" but lost to "The Prayer" by Anthony Callea. "A Little Too Late" was the fourth song released from the album on 30 May 2005 and the music video was directed by MTV award-winner Anthony Rose and was premiered 2 May 2005 on the Channel Ten news. The song was only released in Australia and did not chart like the other singles, debuting and peaking at number thirteen. The last song released from the album was "Be Strong", which was only released in Australia as a digital download on 17 October 2005.

Tour

Goodrem launched The Visualise Tour in 2005 where she performed songs from Innocent Eyes and her second album Mistaken Identity. She performed 10 arena shows in Australian capital cities. The show on 24 July at Acer Arena in Sydney was filmed for inclusion on the live DVD for the concert tour entitled The Visualise Tour: Live in Concert, which was released on 13 November 2005. The DVD peaked at number one on the Australian ARIA DVD Chart and was certified four times platinum for sales of 60,000 units.

Track listing

B-sides
The following tracks were not released on the album, but were recorded during the same sessions and were released on the singles.

Personnel 
 David Arch – piano (track 2)
 Billy Mann – background vocals (track 3) guitar (track 3), producer (track 3)
 Jim Brumby – additional engineering (tracks 1 and 2)
 Guy Chambers – acoustic guitar (track 1), bass guitar (tracks 1 and 2), electric guitar (tracks 1 and 2), piano (track 1), producer (tracks 1 and 2)
 Jason Dering – drums (track 3)
 Richard Flack – mixing (tracks 1 and 2), producer (tracks 1 and 2), programming (track 1), tambourine (track 1)
 Delta Goodrem – background vocals (tracks 1 – 3), piano (tracks 1 – 3), keyboards, Concept, writer (all) 
 Conrad Korsch – bass (track 3)
 Brian McLeod – drums (tracks 1 and 2)
 Tessa Niles – background vocals (track 2)
 Gary Nuttall – background vocals (track 2)
 Phil Palmer – acoustic guitar (tracks 1 and 2)
 Steve Power – producer (tracks 1 and 2)
 Guy Pratt – bass guitar (track 2)
 Frank Ricotti – glockenspiel (track 2), marimba (track 2), vibraphone (track 2)
 Chris Rojas – arrangement & programming (track 3) (track 11), strings (track 3), guitar (track 3)
 Paul Stanborough – electric guitar (track 2)
 Eric Schermerhorn – electric guitar (track 1)
 Tim Van der Kuil – electric guitar (track 2)

Charts

Weekly charts

Year-end charts

Decade-end chart

Certifications

Release history

References

2004 albums
Delta Goodrem albums
Epic Records albums
Sony Music Australia albums